Milcoveni may refer to several villages in Romania:

 Milcoveni, a village in Berliște Commune, Caraș-Severin County
 Milcoveni, a village in Corbu Commune, Olt County